The Old Woman's Island, also known as Little Colaba is one of the seven islands composing the city of Mumbai, India, and part of the historic Old Mumbai.

The Colaba Causeway built in 1838, connected this last island to the mainland of Mumbai, along with the island of Colaba.

References

External links
 History of Colaba and Cuffe Parade
 Bombay - History of Reclamation

Islands of Mumbai
Islands of India
Uninhabited islands of India